The Patton Motor Company was a street car manufacturer in Chicago.

History 
The Patton Motor Company was based in 340 and 342 Dearborn St., Chicago, where it manufactured around 1898 patented electric street cars. These were used as a feeder for trolley lines, for nightwork or for long distance work. They were particularly adapted for service where, because of operating expense, the trolley equipment was unsatisfactory. They required no poles, no wires, no power house, no bonding of rails but only ordinary track. The company guaranteed to provide street car service under average conditions for less than two cents per car mile for power.

A gasoline engine was used to drive a dynamo, which in turn operated the electric motor. The principal claim of the inventor was the use of a storage battery, which accumulated the power of the dynamo, when on a down grade, or at rest, and which was automatically connected in to assist when the work was heavy.

The gasoline was stored in a tank in the roof of the car.

The motor cars were used as a smoking car and motor at the Chattagnooga Rapid Transit Company and as an independent motor by the Cedar Falls (Iowa) & Normal Railway. A combination double truck car was also on offer.

References 

Streetcar designers
Streetcars in Illinois
Streetcars articles needing expert attention